is a Japanese professional footballer who plays as a centre back for J.League club Nagoya Grampus.

Playing career
Fujii was born in Aichi Prefecture on December 26, 2000. He joined J1 League club Nagoya Grampus from youth team in 2018.

Career statistics

Updated to 19 July 2022.

References

External links

2000 births
Living people
Association football people from Aichi Prefecture
Japanese footballers
J1 League players
Nagoya Grampus players
Association football defenders